Bagh-e Malek is a city in Khuzestan Province, Iran.

Bagh-e Malek may also refer to:
 Bagh-e Malek, Isfahan
 Bagh-e Malek, Kerman
 Bagh-e Malek County, in Khuzestan Province